Rudy Hernando (born June 10, 1939) is an American former professional tennis player.

A Detroit native, Hernando notably reached the singles fourth round of the 1959 U.S. National Championships. He played collegiate tennis for Lamar Tech and was the 1960 NAIA singles champion. In 1961 he appeared in the singles main draw of the Wimbledon Championships and fell in the first round to the top seed Neale Fraser.

Hernando is a nephew of Boston Red Sox pitcher Alex Mustaikis.

References

External links
 
 

1939 births
Living people
American male tennis players
Tennis people from Michigan
Sportspeople from Detroit
Lamar Cardinals and Lady Cardinals athletes
College men's tennis players in the United States